Tatiana Cocsanova (born 16 January 2004) is a Canadian rhythmic gymnast of Moldovan origin.

Personal life 
Cocsanova was born on 16 January 2004 in Chișinău, Moldova. She took up rhythmic gymnastics at age 6, her idols are Russian gymnasts Alina Kabaeva, Margarita Mamun and Aleksandra Soldatova, Israeli gymnast Linoy Ashram. In 2022 she accomplished her dream of participating in a World Championships. In her free time Tatiana  makes videos for her YouTube channel as well as study science at Vanier College in Montreal.

Career

Junior 
Tatiana entered the Canadian team in 2018, when she finished in 4th at nationals. In 2019 she competed at Élite Canada ending 4th in the All-Around and ribbon, 5th with clubs and won two bronze medals with rope and ball. At the Canadian championships she was 4th with ball and ribbon, won bronze in the All-Around and with rope and gold with clubs. That year she was selected for the Junior Pan Am Championships in Monterrey, ending 5th in the rope final and winning silver in teams.

Senior 
Cocsanova debuted as a senior at the 2020 Élite Canada in Burnaby she was 6th with ribbon but won bronze in the All-Around and with hoop and ball as well as gold with clubs. Because of the Covid-19 pandemic she returned to competition a year later at nationals, winning all the gold medals apart from ball where she got silver.

2022 was her breakout year, Tatiana won Élite Canada and then took part in the World Cup in Sofia taking the 17th place in the All-Around and with hoop, 15th with ball, 8th with clubs and 24th with ribbon. In August she competed at the Commonwealth Games in Birmingham where she won gold in teams along Carmel Kallemaa and Suzanna Shahbazian, later that month she was at the World Cup in Cluj-Napoca, finishing 23rd in the All-Around, 24th with hoop, 29th with ball, 25th with clubs and 16th with ribbon. A month later Cocsanova was selected for the World Championships in Sofia where she competed with ribbon, and finished in 37th.

References 

2004 births
Living people
People from Chișinău
Moldovan emigrants to Canada
Canadian rhythmic gymnasts
Moldovan rhythmic gymnasts
Commonwealth Games medallists in gymnastics
Commonwealth Games gold medallists for Canada
Gymnasts at the 2022 Commonwealth Games
Medallists at the 2022 Commonwealth Games